Geranylgeraniol is a diterpenoid alcohol. It is a colorless waxy solid.

Geranylgeraniol is an important intermediate in the biosynthesis of other diterpenes, of vitamins E, and of K.  It also used in the post-translational modification known as geranylgeranylation.  Geranylgeraniol is a pheromone for bumblebees and a variety of other insects.

Geranylgeraniol is a potent inhibitor of Mycobacterium tuberculosis in vitro.

See also
 Geranylgeranyl pyrophosphate

References

Diterpenes
Fatty alcohols